Jules (Julius) Henri Pierre François Vandenpeereboom (18 March 1843 – 6 March 1917) was a Belgian Catholic Party politician.

Vandenpeereboom was born in Kortrijk and educated as a lawyer. He represented Kortrijk in the Belgian Chamber of People's Representatives from 1878 to 1900.

He held several ministerial posts, beginning with Railways, Posts and Telegraphs, from 1884 to 1899. He combined this with the War ministry from 1896. He served as the prime minister of Belgium in 1899. He was responsible for the introduction of bilingual postage stamps in Belgium in the period 1891 to 1893.

On leaving the Chamber, he was appointed an honorary Minister of State in 1900 and served in the Belgian Senate representing West Flanders. He died in Anderlecht.

See also
 List of defence ministers of Belgium

External links
 Jules Vandenpeereboom in ODIS - Online Database for Intermediary Structures 

1843 births
1917 deaths
Belgian Ministers of State
Catholic Party (Belgium) politicians
People from Kortrijk
Prime Ministers of Belgium
Belgian Ministers of Defence